The Chaos Factor is a 2000 action-thriller film starring Antonio Sabàto Jr. and Fred Ward.

Plot
In this  military thriller, intelligence officer Jack Poynt (Antonio Sabàto Jr.) discovers evidence of a CIA-backed raid on a medical facility in Cambodia in 1972, which led to the torture and killing of a number of civilians. Poynt decides it's high time that the men responsible were exposed and brought to justice, but the deeper he digs in search of the truth, the more he finds himself in danger.

Cast
The Chaos Factor also stars Fred Ward, R. Lee Ermey, and Kelly Rutherford.

External links
 
 

2000 films
2000 action thriller films
American action thriller films
American political thriller films
2000s English-language films
2000s American films